George Mundinger (November 20, 1854 – October 12, 1910) was a Major League Baseball catcher for the 1884 Indianapolis Hoosiers. He played in the minors through 1887.

External links
Baseball-Reference page

1854 births
1910 deaths
19th-century baseball players
Baseball players from Louisiana
Major League Baseball catchers
Indianapolis Hoosiers (AA) players
Minneapolis Millers (baseball) players
Macon (minor league baseball) players
Robert E. Lee's players
Fort Smith Indians players